Brooke Gallupe is the leader of the Canadian indie rock bands Immaculate Machine and Rugged Uncle.

In addition to playing rock music, Gallupe has trained as an opera singer and has played with the Victoria Symphony.

Gallupe is also a comic artist.  Published in Tofu Magazine, Chart Magazine, Lickity Split and the Mint Records Zine, his autobiographic comics often revolve around his band Immaculate Machine.

References

External links
Immaculate Machine

Year of birth missing (living people)
Living people
Canadian rock singers
Canadian songwriters
Canadian indie rock musicians
Canadian rock guitarists